Heinrich Gresbeck, also known as Henry Gresbeck, was a carpenter who was living in the city of Münster in 1534 when the Münster Rebellion began. He wrote the only eyewitness account of events within the city for the fifteen months duration of the rebellion, and played a key role in the recapture of the city by guiding the siege forces of Franz von Waldeck, Bishop of Münster, inside the fortress gates.

For these actions Gresbeck has been described in various texts as a "convert", "traitor", "collaborator", "deserter", "chronicler", and "disgruntled city refugee".

Sources 
"False Prophets and Preachers: Henry Gresbeck’s Account of the Anabaptist Kingdom of Münster"—by Heinrich Gresbeck, translated and edited by Christopher S. Mackay

 published by Truman State University Press -- 

Gresbeck, Heinrich (16th century), article in the Global Anabaptist Mennonite Encyclopedia Online (GAMEO.org) 
 sourced from Mennonitisches Lexikon, 4 vols. Frankfurt & Weierhof: Hege; Karlsruhe: Schneider, 1913-1967: v. II, 172.

"A Companion to Anabaptism and Spiritualism, 1521-1700"—edited by John Roth, James Stayer
 published by BRILL -- 

"The Tailor King: The Rise and Fall of the Anabaptist Kingdom of Munster"—by Anthony Arthur 
 published by St. Martin's Press -- 

"Messiahs and Messianic Movements through 1899"—by Roland H. Worth, Jr. (page 118)
 published by McFarland & Company -- 

"Narrative of the Anabaptist Madness (2 vols): The Overthrow of Münster, the Famous Metropolis of Westphalia"—by Hermann von Kerssenbrock, translated by Christopher S. Mackay
 published by BRILL -- 

"The Radical Reformation, 3rd edition"—by George Huntston Williams
 published by Truman State University Press -- 

Day of Wrath (Dies Irae) in "A History of the Münster Anabaptists" (pp. 153–164) -- translated and edited by George von der Lippe and V. Reck-Malleczewen
 published by Palgrave Macmillan --  -- DOI: 

"The Anabaptist Commune of Münster 1534 -1535", a sourced article on the All Empires Project
"Orgies and executions: It's mayhem in Münster", an article written by Mike Stuchbery for The Local Europe GmbH.

Christian radicalism
History of Anabaptists
History of Münster
16th-century German people
German carpenters